Killyleagh was a constituency represented in the Irish House of Commons until 1800. It was named for the village of Killyleagh.

History
In the Patriot Parliament of 1689 summoned by James II, Killyleagh was represented with two members.

Members of Parliament, 1613–1801
1613–1615 Sir Edward Trevor and John Hamilton
1634–1635 Paul Reynolds and John Hamilton
1639–1649 Paul Reynolds and George Nettleton
1661–1666 Colyn Maxwell and John Swadlyn

1689–1801

Notes

References

Bibliography

Constituencies of the Parliament of Ireland (pre-1801)
Historic constituencies in County Down
1613 establishments in Ireland
1800 disestablishments in Ireland
Constituencies established in 1613
Constituencies disestablished in 1800